White Salmon Glacier is located on Mount Adams in the U.S. state of Washington. Ice flows southwest downhill until the glacier's terminus at about  elevation. White Salmon Glacier has decreased in surface area by 86 percent between 1904 and 2006.

See also
List of glaciers in the United States

References

Glaciers of Mount Adams (Washington)
Mount Adams (Washington)
Gifford Pinchot National Forest
Glaciers of Yakima County, Washington
Glaciers of Washington (state)